Princess Iron Fan, is the first Chinese animated feature film. It is also considered the first Asian animated feature film. The film is based on an episode of the 16th-century novel Journey to the West. It was directed in Shanghai under difficult conditions in the thick of World War II by Wan Guchan and Wan Laiming (the Wan brothers) and was released on November 19, 1941.  The film later became influential in the development of East Asian animation, including Japanese anime and Chinese animation.

Plot
The story was liberally adapted from a short sequence in the popular Chinese novel Journey to the West. Princess Iron Fan is a main character.

Specifically, the film focused on the duel between the Monkey King and a vengeful princess, whose fan is desperately needed to quench the flames that surround a peasant village.

Creators

Background

The Wan family twins Wan Laiming and Wan Guchan with their brothers Wan Chaochen and Wan Dihuan were the first animators in China. After the release of their first "real" cartoon, Uproar in the Studio (1926), they continued to dominate China's animation industry for the next several decades. In the late 1930s, with Shanghai under Japanese occupation, they began work on China's first feature-length animated film. In 1939, the Wan brothers saw Snow White and the Seven Dwarfs and set the standard in attempting to create a film of equal quality for the nation's honor.

The film took three years, 237 artists and 350,000 yuan to make. Rotoscoping was used extensively to save money, and the eyes of the live actors are often visible in the faces of the animated characters.

By 1940, the film would render past 20,000 frames, using up more than 200 thousand pieces of paper (400ream＝500×400). And the final piece would contain  of footage which can be shown in 80 minutes. The Wan brothers also invited the following actors and actresses for sound dubbing (白虹),(严月玲),(姜明),(韩兰根),(殷秀岑). At the time, they were at the Xinhua Film Company animation department since it was the only remaining production company left during the period of the Japanese occupation. The manager of the company who help financed the film was Zhang Shankun.

Princess Iron Fan became the first animated feature film to be made in China. Upon completion the film was screened by the Chinese union film company.

Influence
Princess Iron Fan'''s influences were far-reaching; it was swiftly exported to wartime Japan, inspiring the 16-year-old Osamu Tezuka to become a comics artist and prompting the Japanese Navy to commission Japan's own first feature-length animated film, 1945's Momotaro's Divine Sea Warriors (the earlier film Momotaro's Sea Eagles is three minutes shy of being feature-length).

See also
 History of Animation
 History of Chinese Animation
 Chinese Animation
 List of animated feature films
 List of films in the public domain in the United States

References

Further reading
 Jonathan Clements. (2002). "Chinese Animation". Nickelodeon Magazine.
 Travel Channel China. (2004). "Extensive Info on Wan Brothers". Tieshangongzhu first-length cartoon''.

External links
 
 
  (another version)
 Completed English subtitles for the film
 A few stills from the movie

1941 animated films
1941 films
Chinese animated films
Rotoscoped films
Chinese black-and-white films
Films based on Journey to the West